Streyella canariensis is a moth of the family Gelechiidae. It is found on the Canary Islands.

The forewings are mealy white, sprinkled with greyish fuscous. The hindwings are pale grey.

References

Moths described in 1908
Litini